The following elections occurred in the year 1915.

 1915 Chilean presidential election
 1915 Danish Folketing election
 December 1915 Greek legislative election
 May 1915 Greek legislative election
 1915 Honduran general election
 1915 Liberian general election
 1915 Norwegian parliamentary election
 1915 Salvadoran presidential election
 1915 South African general election

Africa
 1915 South African general election

Europe
1915 Portuguese legislative election

United Kingdom
 1915 Arfon by-election
 1915 Keighley by-election
 1915 Merthyr Tydfil by-election
 1915 Thirsk and Malton by-election

North America

Canada
 1915 Alberta liquor plebiscite
 1915 Edmonton municipal election
 1915 Manitoba general election
 1915 Prince Edward Island general election
 1915 Toronto municipal election
 1915 Yukon general election

United States
 1915 South Carolina's 4th congressional district special election

Oceania

Australia
 1915 Queensland state election
 1915 South Australian state election
 1915 Wide Bay by-election

New Zealand
 1915 Bay of Islands by-election
 1915 Dunedin Central by-election
 1915 Taumarunui by-election

See also
 :Category:1915 elections

1915
Elections